Jenson v. Eveleth Taconite Co., 130 F.3d 1287 (8th Cir. 1997), was the first class-action sexual harassment lawsuit in the United States.  It was filed in 1988 on behalf of Lois Jenson and other female workers at the EVTAC mine in Eveleth, Minnesota on the state's northern Mesabi Range, which is part of the Iron Range.

Facts
Jenson first began working at the site in March 1975 and, along with other women, endured a continuous stream of hostile behavior from male employees, including sexual harassment, abusive language, threats, stalking and intimidation. Their union, USW did nothing to stop it. On October 5, 1984, she mailed a complaint to the Minnesota Department of Human Rights outlining the problems she experienced. In retaliation, her car tires were slashed a week later. In January 1987, the state's agency requested that Ogelbay Norton Co., a Cleveland, Ohio-based part-owner of the mine, pay US$6,000 in punitive damages and $5,000 to Jenson for mental anguish, but the company refused.

On August 15, 1988, attorney Paul Sprenger filed Lois E. Jenson and Patricia S. Kosmach v. Eveleth Taconite Co. in the U.S. District Court in Minneapolis. Class-action status was requested at the time, and granted by James M. Rosenbaum on December 16, 1991.  Jenson quit working at the mine on January 25, 1992, and was diagnosed with post-traumatic stress disorder a short time later.

A liability trial began on December 17, 1992, in front of Judge Richard Kyle in St. Paul, Minnesota, and six months later, he ruled that the company should have prevented the misconduct. The company was ordered to educate all employees about sexual harassment.

Patrick J. McNulty of Duluth was named special master a few months later to oversee a trial that would determine the amount of money owed to the women in damages.  The retired federal magistrate permitted lawyers from the mine company to obtain medical records of all of the women for their entire lifetimes.  Ahead of the trial, the plaintiffs endured long depositions that explored their personal lives in great detail.

The first half of the trial for damages began in Duluth on January 17, 1995 and lasted until February 10. After a break, it resumed on May 22 and ended on June 13.

On March 28, 1996, McNulty released a 416-page report that called the women "histrionic," made public details about their private lives, and awarded them an average of $10,000 each. However, the judgment was appealed and reversed by the Eighth Circuit Court of Appeals on December 5, 1997. A new jury trial on damages was ordered.

Settlement
On December 23, 1998, just before the trial was set to begin, fifteen women settled with Eveleth Mines for a total of $3.5 million.  One of the original plaintiffs, Pat Kosmach, died partway through the case, on November 7, 1994.

The case was documented in the 2002 book Class Action and a 2005 fictionalized film version, North Country.

See also
Hostile Advances: The Kerry Ellison Story movie about Ellison v. Brady which set the "reasonable woman" precedent in sexual harassment law
Hostile work environment
List of class action lawsuits
Meritor Savings Bank v. Vinson
Oncale v. Sundowner Offshore Services
Oglebay Norton Corporation

References

Notes
 U.S. 8th Circuit Court of Appeals case documents
 Class Action: The Story of Lois Jenson and the Landmark Case That Changed Sexual Harassment Law (2003) 
  shlyuha

External links
 
Class Action: What Happens When Employers Refuse To Remedy Sexual Harassment, plus interviews

1988 in Minnesota
Business ethics cases
Class action lawsuits
Harassment case law
History of labor relations in the United States
Sexism
Sexual harassment in the United States
United States Court of Appeals for the Eighth Circuit cases
United States employment discrimination case law
1988 in United States case law
Women in Minnesota
History of St. Louis County, Minnesota